Eugène Guinot (8 April 1805 – 9 February 1861) was a French journalist, writer and playwright, creator of the Parisian chronique

Biography 
He collaborated among others with the Revue de Paris and Le Siècle, signing sometimes his texts under the pen names Paul Vermond or Pierre Durand. A trendy writer in his time, he authored many serial published by great publishing houses such as Hetzel, Hachette or Michel Lévy Frères among others. His plays were presented in the most important Parisian stages of the 19th century: Théâtre des Variétés, Théâtre du Vaudeville, Théâtre du Gymnase-Dramatique etc.

Works 

1837: Suzanne, comédie en vaudevilles in 2 acts, with Mélesville
1839: Lekain à Draguignan, comedy in 2 acts, with Philippe-Auguste-Alfred Pittaud de Forges
1841: Une Nuit au sérail, comedy en 3 acts, mingled with song, with de Forges
1841: Listrac, serial
1841: Physiologie du provincial à Paris, with Carolus-Duran, illustration by Paul Gavarni
1841: L'écu de cent sous, serial
1842: Les Mémoires du diable, comedy in three acts, with Étienne Arago
1843: Jacquot, vaudeville en 1 act
1843: Le bon œil, serial
1843: Le bouquet de violettes, serial
1843: Le chalet, serial
1843: Un héros de roman, serial
1843: Les maris malheureux, short story
1843: Le inconvénients de la vertu, serial
1843: L'Ogresse, ou Un mois au Pérou, comédie en vaudevilles in 2 acts
1844: L'ami du ministre, serial
1844: La Polka, vaudeville in 1 act, with Frédéric Bérat
1845: Le conciliateur, serial
1845: La famille Wilberston, serial
1845: L'héritière, short story
1845: Paris à cheval, revue cavalière en 5 relais, with Carmouche
1845: Les succès, serial
1845: Un tuteur de vingt ans, comédie en vaudevilles in 2 acts, with Mélesville
1846: La Provence ancienne et moderne, 1846
1847: L'Enfant de l'amour ou Les deux marquis de Saint-Jacques, comédie en vaudevilles in 3 acts, with Jean-François-Alfred Bayard
1847: La Cour de Biberach, comédie en vaudevilles in 1 act, with Édouard Lafargue
1847: Les Bords du Rhin
1847: L'amoureux et le bandit, serial
1847: Le dévouement d'une femme, serial
1847: Les exilés de Wissbade, serial
1847: La femme aux cinq maris, serial
1847: Enghien et la vallée de Montmorency, précédé d'une description historique du parcours du chemin de fer du Nord, 1847
1847: Le pactole, short story
1848: Le Lion et le rat, comédie en vaudevilles in 1 act, with Adolphe de Leuven
1848: Le Marquis de Lauzun, comedy in 1 act, mingled with couplets, with Carmouche
1848: La belle cauchoise, comédie en vaudevilles in 1 act, with Gabriel de Lurieu
1849: J'attends un omnibus, vaudeville in 1 act
1849: La Tasse cassée, comédie en vaudevilles in 1 act, with Lubize
1850: Le provincial à Paris, illustration by Gavarni
1850: Colombine, ou les Sept péchés capitaux, comédie en vaudevilles in 1 act, with Pierre Carmouche
1850: Le Maître d'armes, comédie en vaudevilles in 1 act
1850: La Restauration des Stuarts, historical drama in 5 acts
1851: Encore des mousquetaires, vaudeville in 1 act, with Charles Varin
1851: Les Aventures de Suzanne, drama in 5 acts and 8 tableaux, with Charles Dupeuty
1851: Une belle aventurière, serial
1851: Un héros du roman moderne, short story
1851: Une récréation champêtre, short story
1851: Jean le Postillon, monologue on the song by F. Bérat, with Carmouche
1851: Souvenir des eaux de Spa, short story
1852: Chez Dantan, novel
1852: Le mariage forcé, short story
1852: Scapin, comedy in 1 act, mingled with couplets, with Carmouche
1852: Soirées d'avril, novel
1853: A Summer at Baden-Baden
1853: Itinéraire du chemin de fer de Paris à Bruxelles, comprenant l'embranchement de Creil à Saint-Quentin
1854: Promenade au château de Compiègne et aux ruines de Pierrefonds et de Coucy
1854: Un frère terrible, comédie en vaudevilles in 1 act, with Dupeuty
1855: De Paris à Boulogne, à Calais et à Dunkerque
1857: Les chiens de Saint Malo, serial
1857: Le premier pas, serial
1857: Une victime, serial
1857: Un vieux beau, comédie en vaudevilles in 1 act
1858: Ce que c'est qu'une Parisienne, Les Maîtresses à Paris, Les Veuves du diable, novels, with Léon Gozlan
1861: L'été à Bade
1869: Le Provincial à Paris, posth.

Bibliography 
 Zénaïde Fleuriot, Alfred Nettement, Victor Lecoffre, La Semaine des familles: revue universelle hebdomadaire, 1861,  (nécrologie) (Read on line)
 J. Madival, Annuaire des faits, résumé universel chronologique..., 1862, 
 Gustave Vapereau, Dictionnaire universel des contemporains, 1865,  (Read on line)
 Pierre Guiral, Félix Reynaud, Les Marseillais dans l'histoire, 1988, 
 Stéphane Michaud, Flora Tristan, la paria et son rêve: correspondance, 2003, 
 Pierre Échinard, Marseille à la une: l'âge d'or de la presse au XIXe siècle, 2007,

References 

19th-century French journalists
French male journalists
19th-century French dramatists and playwrights
Scientists from Marseille
1805 births
1861 deaths
19th-century French male writers